Salman Kalliyath (born 15 November 1995), is an Indian professional footballer who plays as a forward for Diamond Harbour in the Calcutta Football League.

Career

Gokulam FC

In January 2017, Salman joined the new side Gokulam Kerala FC. Before joining Gokulam Kerala FC, he played 7s Football for Gamestar BP Angadi, Shinestar Alingal and KFC Mangattiri.

Career statistics

References

1995 births
Living people
Indian footballers
Association football forwards
Footballers from Kerala
I-League players
Gokulam Kerala FC players